Kusu Kusu are a group of Japanese singers who notably sang Earth Orchestra from Ranma ½ in 1991. They formed in 1988, and disbanded in 1994. Their members are Jirou, Mu, Say, and Makato. They released their fourth album Cajon shortly after "Earth Orchestra". Most of their recordings have a tropical or world music sounds. In 2009, they made a comeback appearance for a revival of the group.

Works
 Chikyu Orchestra from Ranma ½

External links
 Kusu Kusu at Furinkan.com

Japanese rock music groups
1994 disestablishments in Japan
1980s establishments in Japan